Butyriboletus regius (formerly Boletus regius), commonly known as the royal bolete or red-capped butter bolete, is a basidiomycete fungus of the genus Boletus found in China and  Europe.  B. regius has a pink cap, yellow flesh, and a reticulate pattern on the stem.  Harry D. Thiers described a similar mushroom from California as B. regius, though it is not the same species. B. regius in Europe does not stain when exposed to air, or stains weakly, but the California species stains blue. Both European and California species are considered choice edibles.

Taxonomy
The species was first described and illustrated by Julius Vincenz von Krombholz in 1832. Common names for the mushroom include the red-capped butter bolete and the royal bolete.

Butyriboletus regius was formerly classified as a member of the section Appendiculati of the genus Boletus. Molecular analysis demonstrated that this and related "butter bolete" species, including Boletus appendiculatus, are phylogenetically distinct from Boletus, and the new genus Butyriboletus was created to contain them.

Description

The cap surface is pink to red, occasionally with hints of yellow or brown, more so around the margin. Initially velvety to slightly tomentose (hairy) when young, these minute hairs tend to slough off with age, and the cap develops wrinkles and pits. The cap flesh is yellow, and slowly and erratically bruises blue in North American specimens. The pores on the underside of the cap are angular, and measure about 1–2 per millimetre. The color of the pore surface is bright yellow to start, but eventually darkens somewhat, and will stain blue with damage.

It is solid (i.e., not hollow), and a bright yellow color, often with reddish tones, particularly near the base of the stem. The stem surface can be covered with fine yellow reticulations either throughout its length, or just on the upper portion. Butyriboletus regius produces an olive-brown spore print. Its smooth, hyaline (translucent) spores are roughly elliptical to somewhat fusoid (wider in the middle and tapering toward the ends) to more or less cylindrical, and have dimensions of 12–17 by 4–5 μm.

Chemical tests can be used to help identify Butyriboletus regius in the field. The cap cuticle will stain a pale purple color if FeSO4 is applied; this same test will turn the flesh grayish.

Habitat and distribution
Butyriboletus regius is an ectomycorrhizal species with a broad host range, and associates with oak and conifers, particularly fir. Fruit bodies grow singly, scattered about, or grouped together. In North America, they usually appear from August to November, although they also appear between May and June. The North American distribution includes the Pacific Northwest states of California, Oregon, and Washington, where its frequency of occurrence ranges from "rare to locally abundant". It is rare in Europe, appearing on the Regional Red List of several countries, and is considered endangered in the Czech Republic. The species has also been recorded from China.

See also

List of North American boletes

References

External links

regius
Edible fungi
Fungi described in 1832
Fungi of China
Fungi of Europe
Fungi of North America